MWM may refer to:

MWM (entertainment company), Madison Wells Media, an entertainment company in Los Angeles
 Megan Wants a Millionaire, VH1 reality show starring Megan Hauseman
  Melbourne Winter Masterpieces, an annual series of major exhibitions held in Melbourne
 Million Worker March, a pro-labor demonstration in Washington, D.C.
 Million Woman March, a black women's demonstration in Philadelphia, Pennsylvania in 1997
 Metrowagonmash, a Russian company producing metro cars and other rolling stock
 Motif Window Manager, a window manager for the X Window System based on the Motif toolkit
 MWM (Motoren Werke Mannheim AG) a German company specializing in the manufacturing of Diesel engines. Formerly Deutz Power Systems
 MWM International Motores, formerly MWM Motores Diesel Ltda in Brazil.  A company specialized in the manufacturing of Diesel engines
 the Moustarchindina Wal Moustarchidati, an Islamic movement in Senegal
 Modwheelmood, an electronic-alternative band from Los Angeles
 the Majlis Wahdat-e-Muslimeen, a Shia political party in Pakistan
 married white man, an abbreviation used in personal ads
 Morris water maze, a scientific test typically used on rodents to study behavior
 Megawatt mechanical (MWm) a rarely used measurement in the electric power industry